Tom Seese is a former member of the Ohio House of Representatives.

References

1940s births
Living people
Ohio state senators